Jibon Theke Neya is a 1970 Bengali-language Pakistani film directed by Zahir Raihan. The film is a political satire based on the Bengali Language Movement under the rule of Pakistan metaphorically, where an autocratic woman in one family symbolizes the political dictatorship of Ayub Khan in East Pakistan, and stars Shuchanda, Razzak, Rosy Samad and Shawkat Akbar.

It is the first political film of Bangladesh. According to Ahmad Ishtiaq, writing in The Daily Star, the film is considered to be Zahur Raihan's best. Jibon Theke Neya has been described as an example of "national cinema", using discrete local traditions to build a representation of the Bangladeshi national identity. It is considered a milestone for Bangladeshi cinema and also a classic.

Plot
The story of the film is based on a very ordinary family of Bengal. In one family there are two brothers, Anis (Shawkat Akbar) and Farooq (Razzak), the elder sister Raushan Jamil and the sister's husband Khan Ataur Rahman. Elder sister Raushan Jamil is married. She lives in her father's house. Her husband is very innocent. All the power in the world is in the hands of Raushan Jamil. By abusing this power, she continues to have some kind of dictatorship over her husband and her two brothers. She walks around with a bunch of keys in the area. The housemaid walks around with a drinking bowl behind her. Everyone is restless in her dreadful glory. The character of the then Pakistani dictator has been portrayed in this metaphor. Raushan Jamil's husband Khan Ataur Rahman works as a court employee. Khan Ataur Rahman arranged the marriage of his brother-in-law Shawkat Akbar on the advice of one of his friends. The bride is a quiet, polite girl named Sathi (Rosie Samad). But Raushan Jamil sat completely bent. She is reluctant to marry her brother. He was afraid that the key of the world would not fall and his hand slipped into the hands of his new wife. As a result, Khan Ataur Rahman married his brother without informing Raushan Jamil. Raushan Jamil's sword of oppression came down on her when she became his wife. On the other hand, Farooq alias Razzak fell in love with his younger sister Bithi (Suchanda). If brother-in-law and elder brother give permission, he can also marry Bithi. Sathy and Bithi's elder brother Anwar Hossain. Anwar Hossain is an activist of a political movement. He was imprisoned in the freedom movement. On the other hand, under the leadership of Sathy and Suchanda, everyone in the house became united. Posters are hung on the walls inside their houses. Raushan Jamil's bunch of keys went to the two sisters. The drinking bowl keeps turning behind them. Raushan Jamil lost his power and became crazy and began to make new conspiracies. In the meanwhile, when Sathy and Bithi became pregnant, they were admitted to the hospital. Unfortunately the partner gave birth to a stillborn child. The doctor fears that this grief may not be tolerated by the partner. So Bithi's child was placed in her lap. Thinking it was his own child, the companion began to nurture him. Raushan Jamil conspired and started a dispute between the two sisters. Tactically, he poisoned Bithi and put the blame on her partner. Although Bithi recovered, her partner was arrested on the charge of poisoning. When the case came up in the court, Shawkat Akbar fought the case against his wife, and Khan Ataur Rahman became the lawyer for her partner. Khan Ataur Rahman proved in court that his own wife Raushan Jamil was the main culprit. This is how the story of the film ends.

Cast
 Shuchanda as Bithi
 Razzak as Faruk
 Rosy as Sathi
 Shawkat Akbar as Anis
 Rawshan Jamil
 Khan Ataur Rahman
 Anwar Hossain
 Amjad Hossain as Modhu
 Baby Zaman as Ghotok

Production
The film was originally titled Tinjon meye o ek peyala bish. At the request of film producer Anis Dosani, Zaheer Raihan took over the responsibility of making the film. Zaheer Raihan decided that in the story of the film, one sister will poison another sister. Writer Amjad Hossain could not accept this story because he thought that making a film with such a story would not be hit. However, instead of writing the story as per the words of Zaheer Raihan, Amjad Hossain continued to write the story as his own. Amjad Hossain later said in an interview with Prothom Alo that he could not write the story as directed by the director as he could not continue making a documentary film about Amanullah Asaduzzaman due to government objections.

Shooting for the film began on 1 February, 1970, but some scenes were recorded a year earlier. Pakistan's military government had repeatedly tried to stop the film. The government threatened the film's director and actor Razzak. The director also received death threats for this film.

Music

Khan Ataur Rahman was the music director of this film. Although the use of Tagore Songs was banned by the Information Minister of Pakistan Khwaja Shahabuddin in 1967, a song by Rabindranath Tagore has been used in the film in defiance of that ban.

Release
The film was not released on the scheduled date due to government restrictions. As the film was not released, the people of East Pakistan staged protests and demonstrations in various places. So the government cleared the film and released it. The government banned the film after it was released. The military junta later lifted the ban on the film in the face of protests. The film was shown in East Pakistani cinemas for about six months. The film was also screened in Kolkata, capital of Indian Bengal in 1971.

Reception

Critical reception
Satyajit Ray, Mrinal Sen, Ritwik Ghatak and Tapan Sinha praised the film. Exactly one month after the release of the film, film journalist Ahmed Zaman Chowdhury wrote in the weekly Chitrali magazine, "Zahir has the ease of editing a film, but lacks overall skills. As a result, there is not always an equation of how long a shot will last. So the application ends before it is spread." According to Bidhan Biberu, the film was able to represent the then Bengali society of Pakistan. Criticizing the film, Alamgir Kabir said that the character of the elder sister in the film is arranged in the style of Ayub Khan and the family shown in the film is compared with the politics of Pakistan at that time. However, according to him, such a family is not realistic in the true sense. He noted that many scenes showed in the film were not perfect.

References

External links
 

1970 films
1970 drama films
1970s political films
1970s Bengali-language films
Political satire films
Bengali-language Pakistani films
Bangladeshi political films
Bangladeshi drama films
Films scored by Khan Ataur Rahman
Films directed by Zahir Raihan
Poisoning in film
Films based on Bengali language movement